Julio Díaz (born December 24, 1979) is a Mexican former professional boxer who is a Former IBF Lightweight World Champion the brother of boxing trainer Joel Díaz and former world champion Antonio Díaz.

Professional career
Diaz captured the IBF lightweight interim title with a win over Ricky Quiles in 2006 and then IBF lightweight title with a knockout win over Jesús Chávez in February 2007.

On October 13, 2007, Diaz lost his title to the Mexican American Juan Díaz. 
After a third round knockout loss to Keith Thurman in 2014, Diaz announced his retirement.

Professional boxing record

See also
List of IBF World Champions
List of Lightweight Boxing Champions
List of Boxing Families
List of Mexican boxing world champions

References

External links
 Julio Díaz's Official Homepage
 

People from Jiquilpan, Michoacán
Boxers from Michoacán
International Boxing Federation champions
Lightweight boxers
1979 births
Living people
Mexican male boxers